Earle Odber Parsons, Jr. (September 16, 1921 – December 18, 2014) was an American football halfback who played two seasons with the San Francisco 49ers. He played college football at the University of Southern California, having previously attended high school in his hometown of Helena, Montana. He is a member of the Helena Sports Hall of Fame.

Parsons died on December 18, 2014, at the age of 93.

References

1921 births
2014 deaths
American football halfbacks
Players of American football from Montana
San Francisco 49ers players
Sportspeople from Helena, Montana
USC Trojans football players